Bolan may refer to:

People with the surname Bolan
Betsy Bolan, Survivor contestant
George Bolan (1897–1940), American football player
James S. Bolan (1871–1952), American police commissioner
Kim Bolan (born 1959), reporter
Len Bolan (1909–1973), English footballer
Marc Bolan (1947-1977), British musician and member of the glam rock band T. Rex
Mike Bolan (1933–2016), Canadian politician
Nelson Bolan (born 1990), Nevisian cricketer
Rachel Bolan (born 1966), American musician

Fictional characters
Mack Bolan, from The Executioner

Places
Bolan, Iowa, an unincorporated community in Worth County, Iowa, United States
Bolan, Iran (disambiguation), several places in Iran
Bolan District, a former district of Balochistan Province, Pakistan
Bolan Pass, a location within Balochistan Province, Pakistan

Other uses
Bolan Medical College, a school in Balochistan Province, Pakistan
Bolan, a fictional character in the AMC TV series Hell on Wheels season 1
Bo.lan, Thai restaurant in Bangkok owned and operated by chef Bo Songvisava and her husband

See also

T-Bolan, Japanese rock band
Bollan (disambiguation)
Bolon (disambiguation)